Robert Terrance Barnett (born February 2, 1972, in Fairburn, Georgia), professionally known by his stage name T-Mo Goodie (or simply T-Mo), is an American rapper from Atlanta. He is best known for being a member of Southern hip hop quartet Goodie Mob. He is also one-half of the hip hop duo the Lumberjacks (with fellow Goodie Mob groupmate Khujo), and a member of hip hop collective Dungeon Family. He released his first solo project 2 the Fullest on October 31, 2000, via Stronghouse Productions.

He earned his Bachelor of Science degree from Morris Brown College in Atlanta, Georgia.

Discography
2000 – T-Mo 2 the Fullest
2008 – Freedom

Collaborative albums

1995 – Soul Food (w/ Khujo, Big Gipp, and Cee-Lo Green)
1998 – Still Standing (w/ Khujo, Big Gipp, and Cee-Lo Green)
1999 – World Party (w/ Khujo, Big Gipp, and Cee-Lo Green)
2004 – One Monkey Don't Stop No Show (w/ Khujo and Big Gipp)
2005 – The Goodie Mob Presents: Livin' Life as Lumberjacks (w/ Khujo)
2008 – A.T.L. 2 (A-Town Legends 2) (w/ Pastor Troy and Khujo)
2013 – Age Against the Machine (w/ Khujo, Big Gipp, and Cee-Lo Green)
2020 – Survival Kit (w/ Khujo, Big Gipp, and Cee-Lo Green)

Guest appearances

References

External links

1972 births
Living people
Goodie Mob members
Rappers from Atlanta
21st-century American rappers
African-American male rappers
21st-century American male musicians
Dungeon Family members
Lumberjacks (group) members